Olive oil is a liquid fat obtained by pressing whole olives, the fruit of Olea europaea, a traditional tree crop of the Mediterranean Basin, and extracting the oil. 

It is commonly used in cooking, for frying foods or as a salad dressing. It can also be found in some cosmetics, pharmaceuticals, soaps, and fuels for traditional oil lamps. It also has additional uses in some religions. The olive is one of three core food plants in Mediterranean cuisine, together with wheat and grapes. Olive trees have been grown around the Mediterranean since the 8th millennium BC.

Spain is the world's largest producer, manufacturing almost half of the world's olive oil. Other large producers are Italy, Greece, Tunisia, Turkey and Morocco.

The composition of olive oil varies with the cultivar, altitude, time of harvest, and extraction process. It consists mainly of oleic acid (up to 83%), with smaller amounts of other fatty acids including linoleic acid (up to 21%) and palmitic acid (up to 20%). Extra virgin olive oil is required to have no more than 0.8% free acidity and is considered to have favorable flavor characteristics.

History 

Olive oil has long been a common ingredient in Mediterranean cuisine, including ancient Greek and Roman cuisine. Wild olives, which originated in Asia Minor, were collected by Neolithic people as early as the 8th millennium BC. Besides food, olive oil has been used for religious rituals, medicines, as a fuel in oil lamps, soap-making, and skincare application. The Spartans and other Greeks used oil to rub themselves while exercising in the gymnasia. From its beginnings early in the 7th century BC, the cosmetic use of olive oil quickly spread to all of the Hellenic city-states, together with athletes training in the nude, and lasted close to a thousand years despite its great expense. Olive oil was also popular as a form of birth control; Aristotle in his History of Animals recommends applying a mixture of olive oil combined with either oil of cedar, ointment of lead, or ointment of frankincense to the cervix to prevent pregnancy.

Early cultivation 

It is not clear when and where olive trees were first domesticated. The modern olive tree most likely originated in ancient Persia and Mesopotamia and spread to the Levant and later to North Africa, though some scholars argue for an Egyptian origin.

The olive tree reached Greece, Carthage and Libya sometime in the 28th century BC, having been spread westward by the Phoenicians. Until around 1500 BC, eastern coastal areas of the Mediterranean were most heavily cultivated. Evidence also suggests that olives were being grown in Crete as long ago as 2500 BC. The earliest surviving olive oil amphorae date to 3500 BC (Early Minoan times), though the production of olive oil is assumed to have started before 4000 BC. Olive trees were certainly cultivated by the Late Minoan period (1500 BC) in Crete, and perhaps as early as the Early Minoan. The cultivation of olive trees in Crete became particularly intense in the post-palatial period and played an important role in the island's economy, as it did across the Mediterranean. Later, as Greek colonies were established in other parts of the Mediterranean, olive farming was introduced to places like Spain and continued to spread throughout the Roman Empire.

Olive trees were introduced to the Americas in the 16th century when cultivation began in areas that enjoyed a climate similar to the Mediterranean such as Chile, Argentina, and California.

Recent genetic studies suggest that species used by modern cultivators descend from multiple wild populations, but detailed history of domestication is not yet forthcoming.

Trade and production 

Archaeological evidence shows that by 6000 BC olives were being turned into olive oil and in 4500 BC at a now-submerged prehistoric settlement south of Haifa.

Olive trees and oil production in the Eastern Mediterranean can be traced to archives of the ancient city-state Ebla (2600–2240 BC), which were located on the outskirts of the Syrian city Aleppo. Here some dozen documents dated 2400 BC describe the lands of the king and the queen. These belonged to a library of clay tablets perfectly preserved by having been baked in the fire that destroyed the palace. A later source is the frequent mentions of oil in the Tanakh.

Dynastic Egyptians before 2000 BC imported olive oil from Crete, Syria and, Canaan and oil was an important item of commerce and wealth. Remains of olive oil have been found in jugs over 4,000 years old in a tomb on the island of Naxos in the Aegean Sea. Sinuhe, the Egyptian exile who lived in northern Canaan c. 1960 BC, wrote of abundant olive trees. The Minoans used olive oil in religious ceremonies. The oil became a principal product of the Minoan civilization, where it is thought to have represented wealth.

Olive oil was also a major export of Mycenaean Greece (c. 1450–1150 BC). Scholars believe the oil was made by a process where olives were placed in woven mats and squeezed. The oil was collected in vats. This process was known from the Bronze Age, was used by the Egyptians and continued to be used through the Hellenistic period.

The importance of olive oil as a commercial commodity increased after the Roman conquest of Egypt, Greece and Asia Minor led to more trade along the Mediterranean. Olive trees were planted throughout the entire Mediterranean basin during evolution of the Roman Republic and Empire. According to the historian Pliny the Elder, Italy had "excellent olive oil at reasonable prices" by the 1st century AD—"the best in the Mediterranean". As olive production expanded in the 5th century AD the Romans began to employ more sophisticated production techniques like the olive press and trapetum (pictured left). Many ancient presses still exist in the Eastern Mediterranean region, and some dating to the Roman period are still in use today. Productivity was greatly improved by Joseph Graham's development of the hydraulic pressing system developed in 1795.

Symbolism and mythology 
The olive tree has historically been a symbol of peace between nations. It has played a religious and social role in Greek mythology, especially concerning the name of the city of Athens where the city was named after the goddess Athena because her gift of an olive tree was held to be more precious than rival Poseidon's gift of a salt spring.

Varieties 

There are many olive cultivars, each with a particular flavor, texture, and shelf life that make them more or less suitable for different applications, such as direct human consumption on bread or in salads, indirect consumption in domestic cooking or catering, or industrial uses such as animal feed or engineering applications. During the stages of maturity, olive fruit changes colour from green to violet, and then black. Olive oil taste characteristics depend on which stage of ripeness olive fruits are collected.

Uses

Culinary use 

Olive oil is an important cooking oil in countries surrounding the Mediterranean, and it forms one of the three staple food plants of Mediterranean cuisine, the other two being wheat (as in pasta, bread, and couscous) and the grape, used as a dessert fruit and for wine.

Extra virgin olive oil is mostly used as a salad dressing and as an ingredient in salad dressings. It is also used with foods to be eaten cold. If uncompromised by heat, the flavor is stronger. It also can be used for sautéing.

When extra virgin olive oil is heated above , depending on its free fatty acid content, the unrefined particles within the oil are burned. This leads to deteriorated taste. Refined olive oils are suited for deep frying because of the higher smoke point and milder flavour. It is a "popular myth" that high-quality extra virgin olive oil is a poor choice for cooking as its smoke point is above the temperatures required for most cooking (outside of high-temperature applications like deep frying, shallow frying, and searing), and has greater resistance to oxidation than most other cooking oils, as a result of its antioxidant and mono-unsaturated fat content.

Religious use

Christianity 
The Roman Catholic, Orthodox and Anglican churches use olive oil for the Oil of Catechumens (used to bless and strengthen those preparing for Baptism) and Oil of the Sick (used to confer the Sacrament of Anointing of the Sick or Unction). Olive oil mixed with a perfuming agent such as balsam is consecrated by bishops as Sacred Chrism, which is used to confer the sacrament of Confirmation (as a symbol of the strengthening of the Holy Spirit), in the rites of Baptism and the ordination of priests and bishops, in the consecration of altars and churches, and, traditionally, in the anointing of monarchs at their coronation.

Eastern Orthodox Christians still use oil lamps in their churches, home prayer corners and in the cemeteries. A vigil lamp consists of a votive glass containing a half-inch of water and filled the rest with olive oil. The glass has a metal holder that hangs from a bracket on the wall or sits on a table. A cork float with a lit wick floats on the oil. To douse the flame, the float is carefully pressed down into the oil. Makeshift oil lamps can easily be made by soaking a ball of cotton in olive oil and forming it into a peak. The peak is lit and then burns until all the oil is consumed, whereupon the rest of the cotton burns out. Olive oil is a usual offering to churches and cemeteries.

The Church of Jesus Christ of Latter-day Saints uses virgin olive oil that has been blessed by the priesthood. This consecrated oil is used for anointing the sick.

Iglesia ni Cristo uses olive oil to anoint the sick (in Filipino: Pagpapahid ng Langis), it is blessed by minister or deacon by prayer before anointing to the sick. After anointing, the Elder prays for Thanksgiving.

Judaism 
In Jewish observance, olive oil was the only fuel allowed to be used in the seven-branched menorah in the Mishkan service during the Exodus of the Tribes of Israel from Egypt, and later in the permanent Temple in Jerusalem. It was obtained by using only the first drop from a squeezed olive and was consecrated for use only in the Temple by the priests and stored in special containers. In modern times, although candles can be used to light the menorah at Hanukkah, oil containers are preferred, to imitate the original menorah.

Olive oil was also used to prepare the holy anointing oil used for priests, kings, prophets, and others.

Other 

Olive oil is also a natural and safe lubricant, and can be used to lubricate kitchen machinery (grinders, blenders, cookware, etc.). It can also be used for illumination (oil lamps) or as the base for soaps and detergents. Some cosmetics also use olive oil as their base, and it can be used as a substitute for machine oil. Olive oil has also been used as both solvent and ligand in the synthesis of cadmium selenide quantum dots.

The Ranieri Filo della Torre is an international literary prize for writings about extra virgin olive oil. It yearly honors poetry, fiction and non-fiction about extra virgin olive oil.

Extraction 

Olive oil is produced by grinding olives and extracting the oil by mechanical or chemical means. Green olives usually produce more bitter oil, and overripe olives can produce oil with fermentation defects, so for good extra virgin olive oil care is taken to make sure the olives are perfectly ripened. The process is generally as follows:

 The olives are ground into paste using large millstones (traditional method), hammer, blade or disk mill (modern method).
 If ground with millstones, the olive paste generally stays under the stones for 30 to 40 minutes. A shorter grinding process may result in a more raw paste that produces less oil and has a less ripe taste, a longer process may increase oxidation of the paste and reduce the flavor. After grinding, the olive paste is spread on fiber disks, which are stacked on top of each other in a column, then placed into the press. Pressure is then applied onto the column to separate the vegetal liquid from the paste. This liquid still contains a significant amount of water. Traditionally the oil was shed from the water by gravity (oil is less dense than water). This very slow separation process has been replaced by centrifugation, which is much faster and more thorough. The centrifuges have one exit for the (heavier) watery part and one for the oil. Olive oil should not contain significant traces of vegetal water as this accelerates the process of organic degeneration by microorganisms. The separation in smaller oil mills is not always perfect, thus sometimes a small watery deposit containing organic particles can be found at the bottom of oil bottles.
 Modern grinders reduce the olives to paste in seconds. After grinding, the paste is stirred slowly for another 20 to 30 minutes in a particular container (malaxation), where the microscopic oil drops aggregate into bigger drops, which facilitates the mechanical extraction. The paste is then pressed by centrifugation/ the water is thereafter separated from the oil in a second centrifugation as described before.The oil produced by only physical (mechanical) means as described above is called virgin oil. Extra virgin olive oil is virgin olive oil that satisfies specific high chemical and organoleptic criteria (low free acidity, no or very little organoleptic defects). A higher grade extra virgin olive oil is mostly dependent on favourable weather conditions; a drought during the flowering phase, for example, can result in a lower quality (virgin) oil. It is worth noting that olive trees produce well every couple of years, so greater harvests occur in alternate years (the year in-between is when the tree yields less). However the quality is still dependent on the weather.
 Sometimes the produced oil will be filtered to eliminate remaining solid particles that may reduce the shelf life of the product. Labels may indicate the fact that the oil has not been filtered, suggesting a different taste. Fresh unfiltered olive oil usually has a slightly cloudy appearance, and is therefore sometimes called cloudy olive oil. This form of olive oil used to be popular only among small scale producers but is now becoming "trendy", in line with consumer's demand for products that are perceived to be less processed. But generally, if not tasted or consumed soon after production, filtered olive oil should be preferred: "Some producers maintain that extra-virgin olive oils do not need filtration but also that filtration is detrimental to oil quality. This point of view should be considered as erroneous and probably the result of improper implementation of this operation. In fact, fine particles that are suspended in a virgin olive oil, even after the most effective centrifugal finishing, contain water and enzymes that may impair oil stability and ruin its sensory profile. [...] Filtration makes an extra-virgin olive oil more stable and also more attractive. If the suspended particles are not removed they slowly agglomerate and flocculate, forming a deposit on the bottom of the storage containers. Such a deposit continues to be at risk of enzymatic spoilage and, in the worst case, of development of anaerobic micro-organisms with further spoilage and hygienic risk. [...] It is [...] recommended that filtration be carried out as soon as possible after centrifugal separation and finishing."

Ancient Levant
In the ancient Levant, three methods were used to produce different grades of olive oil. The finest oil was produced from fully developed and ripe olives harvested solely from the apex of the tree, and lightly pressed, "for what flows from light pressure is very sweet and very thin." The remaining olives are pressed with a heavier weight, and vary in ripeness. Inferior oil is produced from unripe olives that are stored for extended periods of time until they grow soft or begin to shrivel to become more fit for grinding. Others are left for extended periods in pits in the ground to induce sweating and decay before they are ground. According to the Geoponica, salt and a little nitre are added when oil is stored.

Oil was sometimes extracted from unripe olives, known in medieval times as anfa kinon (Greek ὀμφάκιον, ὀμφάχινον; Latin omphacium), and used in cuisine and in medicine.

Pomace handling

The remaining semi-solid waste, called pomace, retains a small quantity (about 5–10%) of oil that cannot be extracted by further pressing, but only with chemical solvents. This is done in specialized chemical plants, not in the oil mills. The resulting oil is not "virgin" but "pomace oil".

Handling of olive waste is an environmental challenge because the wastewater, which amounts to millions of tons (billions of liters) annually in the European Union, is not biodegradable, is toxic to plants, and cannot be processed through conventional water treatment systems. Traditionally, olive pomace would be used as compost or developed as a possible biofuel, although these uses introduce concern due to chemicals present in the pomace. A process called "valorization" of olive pomace is under research and development, consisting of additional processing to obtain value-added byproducts, such as animal feed, food additives for human products, and phenolic and fatty acid extracts for potential human use.

Global market

Production 

Spain produced 44% of world production. The next largest producers were Italy, Greece, Tunisia, Turkey and Morocco.

Some 75% of Spain's production derives from the region of Andalucía, particularly within Jaén province which produces 70% of the olive oil in Spain. The world's largest olive oil mill (almazara, in Spanish), capable of processing 2,500 tonnes of olives per day, is in the town of Villacarrillo, Jaén. Major Italian producers are the regions of Calabria and, above all, Apulia. Many PDO and PGI extra-virgin olive oil are produced in these regions. Extra-virgin olive oil is also produced in Tuscany, in cities like Lucca, Florence, Siena which are also included in the association of Città dell'Olio. Italy imports about 65% of Spanish olive oil exports.

Global consumption 
San Marino has by far the largest per capita consumption of olive oil worldwide, around 22 kg per year. Consumption in Greece is 12 kg; Spain 11.7 kg; Italy 8.2 kg; Portugal 7.9 kg; and Israel, around 3 kg. Northern Europe and North America consume far less, around 0.7 L, but the consumption of olive oil outside its home territory has been rising steadily.

Regulation 

The International Olive Council (IOC) is an intergovernmental organisation of states that produce olives or products derived from olives, such as olive oil. The IOC officially governs 95% of international production and holds great influence over the rest. The EU regulates the use of different protected designation of origin labels for olive oils.

The United States is not a member of the IOC and is not subject to its authority, but on October 25, 2010, the U.S. Department of Agriculture adopted new voluntary olive oil grading standards that closely parallel those of the IOC, with some adjustments for the characteristics of olives grown in the U.S. Additionally, U.S. Customs regulations on "country of origin" state that if a non-origin nation is shown on the label, then the real origin must be shown on the same side of the label and in comparable size letters so as not to mislead the consumer. Yet most major U.S. brands continue to put "imported from Italy" on the front label in large letters and other origins on the back in very small print. "In fact, olive oil labeled 'Italian' often comes from Turkey, Tunisia, Morocco, Spain, and Greece." This makes it unclear what percentage of the olive oil is really of Italian origin.

Commercial grades 

All production begins by transforming the olive fruit into olive paste by crushing or pressing. This paste is then malaxed (slowly churned or mixed) to allow the microscopic oil droplets to agglomerate. The oil is then separated from the watery matter and fruit pulp with the use of a press (traditional method) or centrifugation (modern method). After extraction the remnant solid substance, called pomace, still contains a small quantity of oil.

One parameter used to characterise an oil is its acidity. In this context, "acidity" is not chemical acidity in the sense of pH, but the percent (measured by weight) of free oleic acid. Measured by quantitative analysis, acidity is a measure of the hydrolysis of the oil's triglycerides: as the oil degrades, more fatty acids are freed from the glycerides, increasing the level of free acidity and thereby increasing hydrolytic rancidity. Another measure of the oil's chemical degradation is the peroxide value, which measures the degree to which the oil is oxidized by free radicals, leading to oxidative rancidity. Phenolic acids present in olive oil also add acidic sensory properties to aroma and flavor.

The grades of oil extracted from the olive fruit can be classified as:
 Virgin means the oil was produced by the use of mechanical means only, with no chemical treatment. The term virgin oil with reference to production method includes all grades of virgin olive oil, including Extra virgin, Virgin, Ordinary virgin and Lampante virgin olive oil products, depending on quality (see below).
 Lampante virgin oil is olive oil extracted by virgin (mechanical) methods but not suitable for human consumption without further refining; “lampante” is the attributive form of “lampa”, the Italian word for “lamp”, referring to the earlier use of such oil in oil lamps. Lampante virgin oil can be used for industrial purposes, or refined (see below) to make it edible.
 Refined olive oil is the olive oil obtained from any grade of virgin olive oil by refining methods which do not lead to alterations in the initial glyceridic structure. The refining process removes colour, odour and flavour from the olive oil, and leaves behind a very pure form of olive oil that is tasteless, colourless and odourless and extremely low in free fatty acids. Olive oils sold as the grades Extra virgin olive oil and Virgin olive oil therefore cannot contain any refined oil.
 Crude olive pomace oil is the oil obtained by treating olive pomace (the leftover paste after the pressing of olives for virgin olive oils) with solvents or other physical treatments, to the exclusion of oils obtained by re-esterification processes and of any mixture with oils of other kinds. It is then further refined into Refined olive pomace oil and once re-blended with virgin olive oils for taste, is then known as Olive pomace oil.

International Olive Council
In countries that adhere to the standards of the International Olive Council, as well as in Australia, and under the voluntary United States Department of Agriculture labeling standards in the United States:

Extra virgin olive oil is the highest grade of virgin olive oil derived by cold mechanical extraction without use of solvents or refining methods. It contains no more than 0.8% free acidity, and is judged to have a superior taste, having some fruitiness and no defined sensory defects. Extra virgin olive oil accounts for less than 10% of oil in many producing countries; the percentage is far higher in some Mediterranean countries.

According to International Olive Council, median of the fruity attribute must be higher than zero for a given olive oil in order to meet the criteria of extra virgin olive oil classification.

Virgin olive oil is a lesser grade of virgin oil, with free acidity of up to 2.0%, and is judged to have a good taste, but may include some sensory defects.

Refined olive oil is virgin oil that has been refined using charcoal and other chemical and physical filters, methods which do not alter the glyceridic structure. It has a free acidity, expressed as oleic acid, of not more than 0.3 grams per 100 grams (0.3%) and its other characteristics correspond to those fixed for this category in this standard. It is obtained by refining virgin oils to eliminate high acidity or organoleptic defects. Oils labeled as Pure olive oil or Olive oil are primarily refined olive oil, with a small addition of virgin for taste.

Olive pomace oil is refined pomace olive oil, often blended with some virgin oil. It is fit for consumption, but may not be described simply as olive oil. It has a more neutral flavor than pure or virgin olive oil, making it unfashionable among connoisseurs; however, it has the same fat composition as regular olive oil, giving it the same health benefits. It also has a high smoke point, and thus is widely used in restaurants as well as home cooking in some countries.

United States 
As the United States is not a member, the IOC retail grades have no legal meaning there, but on October 25, 2010, the United States Department of Agriculture (USDA) established Standards for Grades of Olive Oil and Olive-Pomace Oil, which closely parallel the IOC standards:
 U.S. Extra Virgin Olive Oil for oil with excellent flavor and odor and free fatty acid content of not more than 0.8 g per 100 g (0.8%);
 U.S. Virgin Olive Oil for oil with reasonably good flavor and odor and free fatty acid content of not more than 2 g per 100 g (2%);
 U.S. Virgin Olive Oil Not Fit For Human Consumption Without Further Processing is a virgin (mechanically-extracted) olive oil of poor flavor and odor, equivalent to the IOC's lampante oil;
 U.S. Olive Oil is a mixture of virgin and refined oils;
 U.S. Refined Olive Oil is an oil made from refined oils with some restrictions on the processing.

These grades are voluntary. Certification is available, for a fee, from the USDA.

In 2014, California adopted a set of olive oil standards for olive oil made from California-grown olives. The California Department of Food and Agriculture Grade and Labeling Standards for Olive Oil, Refined-Olive Oil and Olive-Pomace Oil are mandatory for producers of more than 5,000 gallons of California olive oil. This joins other official state, federal and international olive oil standards.

Several olive producer associations, such as the North American Olive Oil Association and the California Olive Oil Council, also offer grading and certification within the United States. Oleologist Nicholas Coleman suggests that the California Olive Oil Council certification is the most stringent of the voluntary grading schemes in the United States.

Country of origin can be established by one or two letter country codes printed on the bottle or label. Country codes include I=Italy, GR=Greece, E=Spain, TU=Tunisia, MA=Morocco, CL=Chile, AG=Argentina, AU=Australia.

Label wording 
 Different names for olive oil indicate the degree of processing the oil has undergone as well as the quality of the oil. Extra virgin olive oil is the highest grade available, followed by virgin olive oil. The word "virgin" indicates that the olives have been pressed to extract the oil; no heat or chemicals have been used during the extraction process, and the oil is pure and unrefined. Virgin olive oils contain the highest levels of polyphenols, antioxidants that have been linked with better health.
 Olive Oil, which is sometimes denoted as being "Made from refined and virgin olive oils" is a blend of refined olive oil with a virgin grade of olive oil. Pure, Classic, Light and Extra-Light are terms introduced by manufacturers in countries that are non-traditional consumers of olive oil for these products to indicate both their composition of being only 100% olive oil, and also the varying strength of taste to consumers. Contrary to a common consumer belief, they do not have fewer calories than extra virgin oil as implied by the names.
 Cold pressed or Cold extraction means "that the oil was not heated over a certain temperature (usually ) during processing, thus retaining more nutrients and undergoing less degradation". The difference between Cold Extraction and Cold Pressed is regulated in Europe, where the use of a centrifuge, the modern method of extraction for large quantities, must be labelled as Cold Extracted, while only a physically pressed olive oil may be labelled as Cold Pressed. In many parts of the world, such as Australia, producers using centrifugal extraction still label their products as Cold Pressed.
 First cold pressed means "that the fruit of the olive was crushed exactly one time – i.e., the first press. The cold refers to the temperature range of the fruit at the time it is crushed". In Calabria (Italy) the olives are collected in October. In regions like Tuscany or Liguria, the olives collected in November and ground, often at night, are too cold to be processed efficiently without heating. The paste is regularly heated above the environmental temperatures, which may be as low as 10–15 °C, to extract the oil efficiently with only physical means. Olives pressed in warm regions like Southern Italy or Northern Africa may be pressed at significantly higher temperatures although not heated. While it is important that the pressing temperatures be as low as possible (generally below 25 °C) there is no international reliable definition of "cold pressed".Furthermore, there is no "second" press of virgin oil, so the term "first press" means only that the oil was produced in a press vs. other possible methods.
 Protected designation of origin (PDO) and protected geographical indication (PGI) refer to olive oils with "exceptional properties and quality derived from their place of origin as well as from the way of their production".
 The label may indicate that the oil was bottled or packed in a stated country. This does not necessarily mean that the oil was produced there. The origin of the oil may sometimes be marked elsewhere on the label; it may be a mixture of oils from more than one country.
 The U.S. Food and Drug Administration permitted a claim on olive oil labels stating: "Limited and not conclusive scientific evidence suggests that eating about two tablespoons (23 g) of olive oil daily may reduce the risk of coronary heart disease."

Adulteration 
There have been allegations, particularly in Italy and Spain, that regulation can be sometimes lax and corrupt. Major shippers are claimed to routinely adulterate olive oil so that only about 40% of olive oil sold as "extra virgin" in Italy actually meets the specification. In some cases, colza oil (extracted from rapeseed) with added colour and flavor has been labeled and sold as olive oil. This extensive fraud prompted the Italian government to mandate a new labeling law in 2007 for companies selling olive oil, under which every bottle of Italian olive oil would have to declare the farm and press on which it was produced, as well as display a precise breakdown of the oils used, for blended oils. In February 2008, however, EU officials took issue with the new law, stating that under EU rules such labeling should be voluntary rather than compulsory. Under EU rules, olive oil may be sold as Italian even if it only contains a small amount of Italian oil.

Extra virgin olive oil has strict requirements and is checked for "sensory defects" that include: rancid, fusty, musty, winey (vinegary) and muddy sediment. These defects can occur for different reasons. The most common are:
 Raw material (olives) infected or battered
 Inadequate harvest, with contact between the olives and soil

In March 2008, 400 Italian police officers conducted Operation Golden Oil, arresting 23 people and confiscating 85 farms after an investigation revealed a large-scale scheme to relabel oils from other Mediterranean nations as Italian. In April 2008, another operation impounded seven olive oil plants and arrested 40 people in nine provinces of northern and southern Italy for adding chlorophyll to sunflower and soybean oil, and selling it as extra virgin olive oil, both in Italy and abroad; 25,000 liters of the fake oil were seized and prevented from being exported.

On March 15, 2011, the prosecutor's office in Florence, Italy, working in conjunction with the forestry department, indicted two managers and an officer of Carapelli, one of the brands of the Spanish company Grupo SOS (which recently changed its name to Deoleo). The charges involved falsified documents and food fraud. Carapelli lawyer Neri Pinucci said the company was not worried about the charges and that "the case is based on an irregularity in the documents."

In February 2012, Spanish authorities investigated an international olive oil scam in which palm, avocado, sunflower and other cheaper oils were passed off as Italian olive oil. Police said the oils were blended in an industrial biodiesel plant and adulterated in a way to hide markers that would have revealed their true nature. The oils were not toxic and posed no health risk, according to a statement by the Guardia Civil. Nineteen people were arrested following the year-long joint probe by the police and Spanish tax authorities, part of what they call Operation Lucerna.

Using tiny print to state the origin of blended oil is used as a legal loophole by manufacturers of adulterated and mixed olive oil.

Journalist Tom Mueller has investigated crime and adulteration in the olive oil business, publishing the article "Slippery Business" in New Yorker magazine, followed by the 2011 book Extra Virginity. On 3 January 2016 Bill Whitaker presented a program on CBS News including interviews with Mueller and with Italian authorities. It was reported that in the previous month 5,000 tons of adulterated olive oil had been sold in Italy, and that organised crime was heavily involved—the term "Agrimafia" was used. The point was made by Mueller that the profit margin on adulterated olive oil was three times that on the illegal narcotic drug cocaine. He said that over 50% of olive oil sold in Italy was adulterated, as was 75–80% of that sold in the US. Whitaker reported that three samples of "extra virgin olive oil" had been bought in a US supermarket and tested; two of the three samples did not meet the required standard, and one of them—with a top-selling US brand—was exceptionally poor.

In early February 2017, the Carabinieri arrested 33 suspects in the Calabrian mafia's Piromalli 'ndrina ('Ndrangheta) which was allegedly exporting fake extra virgin olive oil to the U.S.; the product was actually inexpensive olive pomace oil fraudulently labeled. Less than a year earlier, the American television program 60 Minutes had warned that "the olive oil business has been corrupted by the Mafia" and that "Agromafia" was a $16-billion per year enterprise. A Carabinieri investigator interviewed on the program said that "olive oil fraud has gone on for the better part of four millennia" but today, it's particularly "easy for the bad guys to either introduce adulterated olive oils or mix in lower quality olive oils with extra-virgin olive oil". Weeks later, a report by Forbes stated that "it's reliably reported that 80% of the Italian olive oil on the market is fraudulent" and that "a massive olive oil scandal is being uncovered in Southern Italy (Puglia, Umbria and Campania)".

Constituents 

Olive oil is composed mainly of the mixed triglyceride esters of oleic acid, linoleic acid, palmitic acid and of other fatty acids, along with traces of squalene (up to 0.7%) and sterols (about 0.2% phytosterol and tocosterols). The composition varies by cultivar, region, altitude, time of harvest, and extraction process.

Phenolic composition 
Olive oil contains traces of phenolics (about 0.5%), such as esters of tyrosol, hydroxytyrosol, oleocanthal and oleuropein, which give extra virgin olive oil its bitter, pungent taste, and are also implicated in its aroma. Olive oil is a source of at least 30 phenolic compounds, among which are elenolic acid, a marker for maturation of olives, and alpha-tocopherol, one of the eight members of the Vitamin E family. Oleuropein, together with other closely related compounds such as 10-hydroxyoleuropein, ligstroside and 10-hydroxyligstroside, are tyrosol esters of elenolic acid.

Other phenolic constituents include flavonoids, lignans and pinoresinol.

Nutrition 

One tablespoon of olive oil (13.5 g) contains the following nutritional information according to the USDA:
 Food energy: 
 Fat: 13.5 g (21% of the Daily Value, DV)
 Saturated fat: 2 g (9% of DV)
 Carbohydrates: 0
 Fibers: 0
 Protein: 0
 Vitamin E: 1.9 mg (10% of DV)
 Vitamin K: 8.1 µg (10% of DV)

Comparison to other vegetable oils (below)

Potential health effects 

In the United States, the FDA allows producers of olive oil to place the following qualified health claim on product labels:

In a review by the European Food Safety Authority (EFSA) in 2011, health claims on olive oil were approved for protection by its polyphenols against oxidation of blood lipids, and for maintenance of normal blood LDL-cholesterol levels by replacing saturated fats in the diet with oleic acid. (See also: Commission Regulation (EU) 432/2012 of 16 May 2012). Despite its approval, the EFSA has noted that a definitive cause-and-effect relationship has not been adequately established for consumption of olive oil and maintaining normal (fasting) blood concentrations of triglycerides, normal blood HDL-cholesterol concentrations, and normal blood glucose concentrations.

A 2014 meta-analysis concluded that increased consumption of olive oil was associated with reduced risk of all-cause mortality, cardiovascular events and stroke, while monounsaturated fatty acids of mixed animal and plant origin showed no significant effects. Another meta-analysis in 2018 found high-polyphenol olive oil intake was associated with improved measures of total cholesterol, HDL cholesterol, malondialdehyde, and oxidized LDL when compared to low-polyphenol olive oils, although it recommended longer studies, and more investigation of non-Mediterranean populations.

See also 

 Amurca
 List of ancient dishes and foods
 List of cuisines
 List of dips

References

Further reading 

 Caruso, Tiziano; Magnano di San Lio, Eugenio (eds.). La Sicilia dell'olio, Giuseppe Maimone Editore, Catania, 2008, 
 Mueller, Tom. Extra Virginity – The Sublime and Scandalous World of Olive Oil, Atlantic Books, London, 2012. .
 Pagnol, Jean. L'Olivier, Aubanel, 1975. .
 Palumbo, Mary; Linda J. Harris (December 2011) "Microbiological Food Safety of Olive Oil: A Review of the Literature" (PDF), University of California, Davis
 Preedy, V. R.; Watson, R. R. (eds.). Olives and Olive Oil in Health and Disease Prevention, Academic Press, 2010. .
 Rosenblum, Mort. Olives: The Life and Lore of a Noble Fruit, North Point Press, 1996. .
 CODEX STAN 33-1981 Standard for Olive Oils and Olive Pomace Oils

 
Condiments
Cooking oils
Mediterranean cuisine
Vegetable oils